A concourse is a place where pathways or roads meet, such as in a hotel, a convention center, a railway station, an airport terminal, a hall, or other space.

The term is not limited to places where there are literally pathways or roadways or train tracks joining.  An alternate meaning now is "an open space or hall (as in a railway terminal) where crowds gather."  In this meaning as a place where crowds gather, while many persons in any crowd no doubt have followed different paths in their lives to get to the place, there need not be notable specific roadways leading to the place.

Examples
Examples of concourses include:

 Meeting halls
 Universities
 Railway stations
 Conference centres
 Hotels
 Airport terminals
 Shopping malls or portions of shopping malls which are often called "shopping concourses"
 Sports arenas and stadiums

Gallery

Outdoor concourses

Public transport concourses

Car park concourses

Contemporary usage
More recently, "concourse" is often used to refer to a situation where people come together in online presence, even if they do not physically come together in reality. An example of such an online community is the IEEE Student Concourse, as well as various online shopping concourses.

See also
 Concourse Program at MIT
 Concourse on High (Bahá'í Faith)
 Concourse at Landmark Center
 Grand Concourse (Bronx)

References

External links

IEEE Student Concourse

Footpaths
Railway stations